Samuel Fuller (c. 1580/81 – between August 9 and September 26, 1633 in Plymouth) was a passenger on the historic 1620 voyage of the Pilgrim ship Mayflower and became a respected church deacon and the physician for Plymouth Colony.

Servant traveling in company with Samuel Fuller on the Mayflower 
William Butten sailed on the Mayflower as an indentured servant to Samuel Fuller, and was listed as "a youth." According to popular belief, his father had died when he was young and his mother could not financially support him.
Author Caleb Johnson provides his research that the Butten family had an early association with the Leiden Separatists, and that William, son of John, was baptized on March 13, 1605 at Worksop, Nottinghamshire. Some Leiden church members were known in Worksop, as early Separatist churches were developed there. Worksop is located near William Bradford's birthplace in Austerfield, Yorkshire.

Butten was sick for most of the two-month Mayflower voyage and died on November 6, 1620 – just three days before the sighting of Cape Cod. William Bradford wrote "in all this voyage there died but one of the passengers, which was William Butten, a youth, servant to Samuel Fuller, when they drew near the coast."

Provincetown on Cape Cod has several present-day memorials to William Butten and several others who were the earliest Mayflower passengers to die.

References

Further reading
Norman Gevitz, "Samuel Fuller of Plymouth Plantation: A 'Skillful Physician' or 'Quacksalver'?'", Journal of the History of Medicine and Allied Sciences 47 (1992): 29-48.
Arthur and Katherine Radasch, Mayflower Families for Five Generations: Francis Eaton, Samuel Fuller and William White, volume 1 (Plymouth: General Society of Mayflower Descendants, 1974).
Francis H. Fuller, Early New England Fullers, New England Historical and Genealogical Register 55(1901):192-196.
Francis H. Fuller, Fullers of Redenhall, England, New England Historical and Genealogical Register 55(1901):410-414.
Will of Samuel Fuller
References to Samuel Fuller

1580 births
1633 deaths
Mayflower passengers
People from Redenhall with Harleston